Verkhniye Tatyshly (Ürge Täteşle) is a rural locality (a selo) and the administrative center of Tatyshlinsky District in the Republic of Bashkortostan, Russia. Population:

References

Rural localities in Tatyshlinsky District